The Trentino-Alto Adige/Südtirol regional election of 1988 took place on 20 November 1988.

The Christian Democratic alliance DC-SVP was joined by the Socialists.

Results

Regional Council

Source: Trentino-Alto Adige/Südtirol Region

Province of Trento

Source: Trentino-Alto Adige/Südtirol Region

Province of Bolzano

Source: Trentino-Alto Adige/Südtirol Region 

Elections in Trentino-Alto Adige/Südtirol
1988 elections in Italy